The 1971 UC Davis Aggies football team represented the University of California, Davis as a member of the Far Western Conference (FWC) during the 1971 NCAA College Division football season. Led by second-year head coach Jim Sochor, UC Davis compiled an overall record of 9–1 with a mark of 5–1 in conference play, sharing the FWC title with Chico State. This started a remarkable run in which the Aggies won or shared the conference crown for 20 consecutive seasons. The team outscored its opponents 305 to 184 for the season. The Aggies played home games at Toomey Field in Davis, California.

Schedule

Notes

References

UC Davis
Northern California Athletic Conference football champion seasons
UC Davis Aggies football seasons
UC Davis Aggies football